ʿAlī ibn Muḥammad ibn ʿAbd al-ʿAzīz Ibn Futūḥ ibn Ibrahīm ibn Abū Bakr (1312–1359/62 CE), known as Ibn Durayhim al-Mawsilī was a writer, mathmetician, cryptologist and scribe.

Cryptology 
Ibn al-Durayhim gave detailed descriptions of eight cipher systems that discussed substitution ciphers, leading to the earliest suggestion of a "tableau" of the kind that two centuries later became known as the "Vigenère table".

His book entitled Clear Chapters Goals and Solving Ciphers (مقاصد الفصول المترجمة عن حل الترجمة) was recently discovered, but has yet to be published. It includes the use of the statistical techniques pioneered by Al-Kindi and Ibn 'Adlan.

The Book on the Usefulness of Animals 
In the year 1355 CE, Ibn al-Durayhim compiled the Book on the Usefulness of Animals. The work draws largely on the work of Ibn Bakhtīshūʿ and Aristotle. The manuscript is now housed in the Escorial Library (Ar.898). The text contains 91 illustrations of various animals.

References

1312 births
14th-century deaths
Pre-19th-century cryptographers
Mathematicians of the medieval Islamic world
14th-century Arabs